State Trunk Highway 28 (often called Highway 28, STH-28 or WIS 28) is a  state highway in Dodge, Washington, and Sheboygan counties in southeastern portion of the US state of Wisconsin that runs east–west between Horicon and Sheboygan. The route is generally two-lane road beyond portions of the road within the city of Sheboygan and the half-mile portion of the highway near Waldo which runs concurrently with Wisconsin Highway 57.

Route description

WIS 28 begins at a junction with WIS 33 in Horicon. The highway junctions with WIS 67 northeast of Horicon in Mayvillle and follows WIS 67 north into Theresa. The two highways turn north onto WIS 175 there. The Washington County line is at this junction. WIS 28 crosses US 45 in Kewaskum and turns northeast onto WIS 144 north in Boltonville.

The highway passes through Cascade and joins for a half-mile north with WIS 57 in Waldo. WIS 28 turns east, then leaves its former alignment for a straight-line road south of Sheboygan Falls which was built in the mid-1980s. The road then runs through the southernmost reaches of the Kohler Company's landholdings, and defines the southern boundary of the Blackwolf Run golf course, along with the Deer Trace shopping center before its intersection with I-43. Reaching Sheboygan city limits, the road is defined as Washington Avenue, running  into the city before a northward turn onto South Business Drive, the former US 141, which eventually merges within the city's original plat with 14th Street. The highway's eastern terminus shares the intersection of Erie Avenue and North 14th Street with WIS 23's eastern terminus and WIS 42's southern terminus just north of the Sheboygan River.

History
In 1918, the original routing of WIS 28 was between Dubuque and Spring Green along the present day US 151 and the WIS 23 alignments (prior to the construction of the expressway between Dubuque and Dodgeville). The highway was extended a couple years later to end in Reedsburg, and then expanded to Sheboygan along the former routing of WIS 26 in 1924. Formerly through eastern Sheboygan County, the road's alignment took it through Sheboygan Falls, Kohler, and Sheboygan via what is known as the Lower Falls Road and within Sheboygan, Indiana Avenue.

On October 10, 2019, Governor Tony Evers signed a law establishing the section of WIS 28 between US 41 in Dodge County and WIS 144 in Washington County as the "Wisconsin 9/11 Memorial Highway."

Major intersections

See also

References

External links

028
Transportation in Dodge County, Wisconsin
Transportation in Washington County, Wisconsin
Transportation in Sheboygan County, Wisconsin